The Center for Cognitive Studies at Tufts University is a research unit for various research projects in cognitive studies. Daniel Dennett and Ray Jackendoff are Co-Directors.

External links
 Center for Cognitive Studies Web site

Research institutes in Massachusetts
Cognitive science research institutes